Andrea Soncin (born 5 September 1978) is an Italian football coach and former player, who is currently in charge as youth coach of Venezia.

Football career
Soncin started his professional career at Solbiatese of Serie C2. He then played for Venezia youth team and then loaned back to Solbiatese for a season, and then for Vigevano in Serie D.

He then moved to Perugia of Serie A, but left for Sambenedettese of Serie C1 after 2 months.

On 2003–04 season, he first played for Fiorentina at Serie B then for Pistoiese at Serie C1. He was loaned to Lanciano of Serie C1 in summer 2004. He enjoy his best season at professional league, scored 21 goals.

Atalanta
On 21 July 2005, newly relegated Atalanta signed him. He made 31 league games in his first full Serie B season, and saw he followed Atalanta returned to Serie A.

He made his Serie A debut on 17 September 2006 against Catania. He just managed to play for Atalanta eight times that season, including one games scored against Triestina at Coppa Italia.

Ascoli
On 27 January 2007, he was on loan to Ascoli, to help the club avoid relegation.

He scored 6 goals for the club, just one goal behind team top scorer Saša Bjelanović, who played 10 more games than Soncin.

At the end of season, Ascoli finished 19th, fail to avoid relegation.

Padova
He signed a 2+1 contract with Padova in August 2009. Soncin left Padova at the end of season.

Grosseto

Return to Ascoli

Avellino
On 13 August 2013 he was signed by Avellino.

Pavia
On 17 July 2014 he was signed by A.C. Pavia.

AlbinoLeffe (loan)
On 31 August 2015 Soncin was signed by AlbinoLeffe, on loan from Pavia.

Montebelluna
On 24 October 2016 Soncin was signed by Serie D club Montebelluna.

Coaching career
On 27 April 2022 he was appointed caretaker of Venezia for the final five games of the club's 2021–22 Serie A campaign. He failed to escape the club from relegation and was not offered the permanent job as a consequence, thus moving back to his previous role as youth coach.
On 1 November 2022, following the dismissal of Ivan Javorčić as head coach, Soncin was appointed interim head coach once again. He guided the club for a single game, a 0–1 defeat to Como, before being replaced by new permanent head coach Paolo Vanoli on 7 November 2022.

Managerial statistics

References

External links

aic.football.it 

Italian footballers
Venezia F.C. players
ACF Fiorentina players
S.S. Virtus Lanciano 1924 players
Atalanta B.C. players
U.S. Pistoiese 1921 players
A.C. Perugia Calcio players
Ascoli Calcio 1898 F.C. players
Calcio Padova players
F.C. Grosseto S.S.D. players
U.S. Avellino 1912 players
A.S.D. SolbiaSommese Calcio players
Serie A players
Serie B players
Serie C players
Serie D players
Association football forwards
People from Vigevano
1978 births
Living people
Vigevano Calcio players
Footballers from Lombardy
Sportspeople from the Province of Pavia
Italian football managers
Venezia F.C. managers
Serie A managers